Thomas George Wallace (May 7, 1879 – February 20, 1921) was a Canadian Member of Parliament for the Ontario ridings of York Centre and York West.

Wallace was born in Ottawa, Ontario, on May 7, 1879, and served as a private in the Royal Canadian Regiment during the Second Boer War, serving overseas in South Africa. He later worked as a merchant and miller before being elected to the House of Commons as a member of the Conservative Party for the riding of York Centre in the 1908 federal election. He was re-elected in 1911. After the riding of York Centre was abolished in 1917, Wallace was elected under the Unionist Party banner in the riding of York West in the election of that year.

Thomas George Wallace died in office on February 20, 1920, at the age of 41.

References

1879 births
1920 deaths
Conservative Party of Canada (1867–1942) MPs
Members of the House of Commons of Canada from Ontario